Viñao is a surname. Notable people with the surname include:

Alejandro Viñao (born 1951), Argentine composer
Ezequiel Viñao (born 1960), Argentine composer